Eureka USD 389 is a public unified school district headquartered in Eureka, Kansas, United States.  The district includes the communities of Eureka, Climax, Toronto, Neal, Piedmont, Reece, and nearby rural areas.

Schools
The school district operates the following schools:
 Eureka Jr/Sr High School - 815 N. Jefferson St. in Eureka
 Marshall Elementary School - 1015 N. Jefferson St. in Eureka

See also
 Kansas State Department of Education
 Kansas State High School Activities Association
 List of high schools in Kansas
 List of unified school districts in Kansas

References

External links
 

School districts in Kansas